General Wahl may refer to:

George Douglas Wahl (1895–1981), U.S. Army brigadier general
Lutz Wahl (1869–1928), U.S. Army major general

See also
Viktor von Wahl (1840–1915), Baltic German general
Kurt Wahle (1855–1928), German Imperial Army major general
General Wall (disambiguation)